The Uniformity of Worship Act 1749 (23 Geo. 2, c. 28) was an Act of Parliament passed by the Parliament of Great Britain during the reign of George II. Its full title was "An Act to explain Part of an Act passed in the thirteenth and fourteenth Years of the Reign of King Charles the Second, for the Uniformity of Public Prayers, and Administration of Sacraments; and also Part of an Act passed in the thirteenth Year of the Reign of Queen Elizabeth, for the Ministers of the Church to be of sound Religion".

Notes

Great Britain Acts of Parliament 1749